2017 in women's road cycling is about the 2017 women's bicycle races ruled by the UCI and the 2017 UCI Women's Teams.

World Rankings

♦Change since previous week's rankings♣U23 rider<noinclude>

World Championships

The World Road Championships is set to be held in Bergen, Norway.

UCI Women's WorldTour

Single day races (1.1 and 1.2)

† The clock symbol denotes a race which takes the form of a one-day time trial.

Stage races (2.1 and 2.2)

Source

Championships

International Games

Continental Championships

UCI teams

The country designation of each team is determined by the country of registration of the largest number of its riders, and is not necessarily the country where the team is registered or based.

References

 

Women's road cycling by year
2017 in sports